Christopher John Simpkin (born 24 April 1944, in Hull) is a former professional footballer who played for Hull City, Blackpool, Scunthorpe United, Huddersfield Town, Hartlepool and Scarborough. He also played one season on loan in the North American Soccer League.

References

1944 births
Living people
English footballers
Footballers from Kingston upon Hull
Association football midfielders
English Football League players
Hull City A.F.C. players
Blackpool F.C. players
Scunthorpe United F.C. players
Huddersfield Town A.F.C. players
Hartlepool United F.C. players
Scarborough F.C. players
North American Soccer League (1968–1984) players
Baltimore Comets players
English expatriate sportspeople in the United States
Expatriate soccer players in the United States
English expatriate footballers